The Eddy is a French–American musical drama streaming television miniseries, set in Paris. The first two episodes are directed by Damien Chazelle and written by Jack Thorne. Its music was scored by Glen Ballard and Randy Kerber. The series is unusual in that its dialogue is mainly in French and English and partly in Arabic and Polish. It was released on Netflix on May 8, 2020.

The show stars André Holland as Elliot Udo, an American former jazz musician who moved to Paris to run a club, The Eddy, after the death of his son, Fred. Each episode focuses on Elliot and a different member of the band as they struggle to stay afloat following the murder of Farid, Elliot's best friend and business partner.

Cast

Main
 André Holland as Elliot Udo, the owner of the club, a former pianist and Julie's father. 
 Joanna Kulig as Maja, the lead singer of the club's band.
 Leïla Bekhti as Amira, Farid's wife.
 Adil Dehbi as Sim, the bartender of the club.
 Tahar Rahim as Farid, Elliot's business partner.
 Randy Kerber as Randy, the pianist of the band.
 Ludovic Louis as Ludo, the trumpet player of the band.
 Damian Nueva Cortes as Jude, the bass player of the band.
 Lada Obradovic as Katarina, the drummer of the band.
 Jowee Omicil as Jowee, the saxophone player of the band.
 Amandla Stenberg as Julie Udo, Elliot's troubled teenage daughter.

Recurring
 Benjamin Biolay as Franck Levy
  Léonie Simaga as Commandant Keita
 Melissa George as Alison Jenkins
 Dhafer L'Abidine as Sami Ben Miled
 Vincent Heniene as Martin
 Ouassini Embarek as Paplar, Amira's brother
 Elyes Aguis as Adam, Amira and Farid's son
 Hajar Chafik as Inés, Amira and Farid's daughter
 Louis Moutin as Éric Belmont, a drummer
 Alexis Manenti as Zivko
 Liah O'Prey as Beatrice

Guest
 Jisca Kalvanda as Habiba
 Narcisse Mame as Omar
 Tchéky Karyo as Daniel Perrin
 Richard Keep as Scott, Alison's husband
 Agnieszka Pilaszewska as Kinga, Maja's mother

Episodes

Production
In September 2017, Netflix announced it had ordered eight episodes of the series, with Jack Thorne as principal writer. Damien Chazelle was to direct the first two episodes, and Glen Ballard and Randy Kerber would compose the series's original music. The episodes would include dialog in English, French and Arabic. In November 2018, it was announced Atlantique Productions would produce the series. In February 2019, Tahar Rahim joined the cast and Houda Benyamina was linked to the show as a director. In April 2019, André Holland and Joanna Kulig joined the cast; and in May, Amandla Stenberg joined the cast. In September 2019, Melissa George was cast in a recurring role.

Release
The Eddy was released on Netflix on May 8, 2020.

Reception
On Rotten Tomatoes, the miniseries holds an approval rating of 67% based on 61 reviews, with an average rating of 6.93/10. The website's critical consensus reads, "Viewers willing to slow down the tempo and groove with The Eddy moody atmosphere will find much to enjoy, even when the plot hits familiar beats." On Metacritic, it has a weighted average score of 65 out of 100 based on 21 reviews, indicating "generally favorable reviews".

References

External links
 

2020 American television series debuts
2020 American television series endings
2020 French television series debuts
2020 French television series endings
2020s French drama television series
American musical television series
Arabic-language Netflix original programming
English-language Netflix original programming
French-language Netflix original programming
Polish-language Netflix original programming
Television shows set in Paris